Mekoryuk Airport  is a state-owned public-use airport located three nautical miles (5.5 km) west of the central business district of Mekoryuk, a city in the Bethel Census Area, on Nunivak Island, of the U.S. state of Alaska.

Facilities 
It has one runway designated 5/23 with a gravel surface measuring 3,070 by 75 feet (936 x 23 m).

Airlines and destinations

Prior to its bankruptcy and cessation of all operations, Ravn Alaska served the airport from multiple locations.

References

External links 
 FAA Alaska airport diagram (GIF)
 

Airports in the Bethel Census Area, Alaska